Tonton Susanto (born September 24, 1972) is an Indonesian former professional racing cyclist.

Major results

1997
 1st Stage 13 Tour de Filipinas
2001
 2nd Overall Perlis Open
2002
 2nd  Time trial, Asian Road Championships
 3rd Overall Tour of China
 4th Time trial, Asian Games
2004
 1st WCS seri ke XI di Solo
2005
 1st Tour de Jakarta
 2nd  Time trial, Southeast Asian Games
2006
 7th Overall Tour de East Java
 10th Time trial, Asian Games
2007
 Southeast Asian Games
2nd  Time trial
9th Road race
 2nd Overall Tour of Thailand
 5th Time trial, Asian Road Championships
 10th Overall Tour de East Java
2008
 1st Overall Jelajah Malaysia
 5th Overall Tour de East Java
1st Stage 1
 7th Overall Tour de Indonesia
2009
 7th Overall Tour de Langkawi
 10th Overall Jelajah Malaysia
 10th Overall Tour de Singkarak
2011
 Southeast Asian Games
1st  Time trial
7th Road race
2012
 4th Overall Jelajah Malaysia
 7th Overall Tour de Singkarak
 7th Overall Tour de Borneo
 10th Tour de Jakarta
2013
 9th Overall Tour de Ijen
2015
 7th Time trial, Southeast Asian Games

References

External links

1972 births
Living people
Indonesian male cyclists
Indonesian people of Chinese descent
Place of birth missing (living people)
Cyclists at the 2002 Asian Games
Cyclists at the 2006 Asian Games
Cyclists at the 2010 Asian Games
Southeast Asian Games medalists in cycling
Southeast Asian Games silver medalists for Indonesia
Southeast Asian Games gold medalists for Indonesia
Competitors at the 2005 Southeast Asian Games
Competitors at the 2007 Southeast Asian Games
Competitors at the 2011 Southeast Asian Games
Competitors at the 2015 Southeast Asian Games
Asian Games competitors for Indonesia
21st-century Indonesian people